Pioneer is an unincorporated community in Humboldt County, Iowa, United States. The population was 4 at the time of the 2020 census, and elected to unincorporate as a municipality in 2020.

Geography
Pioneer is located at  (42.654422, -94.390775).

Demographics

2010 census
As of the census of 2010, there were 23 people, 8 households, and 6 families living in the city. The racial makeup of the city was 95.7% White and 4.3% African American.

There were 8 households, of which 25.0% had children under the age of 18 living with them, 62.5% were married couples living together, 12.5% had a male householder with no wife present, and 25.0% were non-families. 12.5% of all households were made up of individuals, and 12.5% had someone living alone who was 65 years of age or older. The average household size was 2.88 and the average family size was 3.33.

The median age in the city was 38.5 years. 26.1% of residents were under the age of 18; 8.6% were between the ages of 18 and 24; 26.1% were from 25 to 44; 21.6% were from 45 to 64; and 17.4% were 65 years of age or older. The gender makeup of the city was 56.5% male and 43.5% female.

2000 census
As of the census of 2000, there were 21 people, 10 households, and 6 families living in the city. The racial makeup of the city was 100.00% White.

There were 10 households, out of which 20.0% had children under the age of 18 living with them, 50.0% were married couples living together, and 40.0% were non-families. 30.0% of all households were made up of individuals, and 20.0% had someone living alone who was 65 years of age or older. The average household size was 2.10 and the average family size was 2.67.

In the city, the population was spread out, with 19.0% under the age of 18, 9.5% from 18 to 24, 19.0% from 25 to 44, 33.3% from 45 to 64, and 19.0% who were 65 years of age or older. The median age was 52 years. For every 100 females, there were 162.5 males. For every 100 females age 18 and over, there were 112.5 males.

The median income for a household in the city was $19,375, and the median income for a family was $36,875. Males had a median income of $22,083 versus $21,250 for females. The per capita income for the city was $10,079. There are 28.6% of families living below the poverty line and 50.0% of the population, including 100.0% of under eighteens and none of those over 64.

Government
At the time of discontinuance, Pioneer had a mayor and three city council members, which met monthly. The only city employee was the part-time city clerk. Though it has lowered its tax rate, city coffers turned over to the county at discontinuance were at "about $150,000".

Infrastructure

Major highways

Utilities
Water service is provided by a county-owned well and water distribution system. As of 2020, the system had three residential customers and the Pro Cooperative grain elevator.

Education
It is within the Gilmore City–Bradgate Community School District.

Notable person
Merle J. Isaac (1898–1996), arranger and composer

References

Cities in Iowa
Cities in Humboldt County, Iowa
Populated places disestablished in 2020